Tetragonoderus lozai is a species of beetle in the family Carabidae. It was described by Allen in 1937.

References

lozai
Beetles described in 1937